Gulmiri , is a town and union council of Mianwali District, Punjab, Pakistan. Gulmiri is located at 32°30'0N 71°35'60E and has an altitude of 200 m (659 ft).

References

Union councils of Mianwali District
Populated places in Mianwali District